Boyne Valley is the valley of the River Boyne in Leinster, Ireland. Boyne Valley may also refer to:

Boyne Valley Township, Michigan, an American township
Boyne Valley (Queensland), a locality in the Gladstone Region, Australia
Brú na Bóinne, a World Heritage Site in County Meath, Ireland